These are the international rankings of Zimbabwe

Economy 

World Economic Forum Global Competitiveness Report 2014–2015 ranked 124 out of 144
United Nations Development Programme 2014 Human Development Index ranked  156 out of 187
International Monetary Fund 2014 GDP (nominal) per capita ranked 160 out of 186 countries

Military

 Institute for Economics and Peace  2010 Global Peace Index 124 out of 144

Politics

 Transparency International: Corruption Perceptions Index 2014, ranked  156 out of 175 countries
 Reporters Without Borders 2015 Press Freedom Index, ranked 131 out of 180 countries
Economist Intelligence Unit 2014 Democracy Index  ranked 150 out of 167 countries

References

Zimbabwe